Tony Moclair (born 4 September 1969 in Cork, Ireland) is an Australian comedy actor, writer, performer and radio broadcaster. He has worked on various Australian radio networks, often appearing in character rather than as himself.

Radio

Moclair has a successful and varied radio career hosting radio shows on a variety of Australian radio stations both as himself and on occasions, in the guise of some of his many character creations.

Guido Hatzis

Guido Hatzis is a Greek-Australian comic character created by Tony Moclair and Julian Schiller and voiced by Moclair. Guido appeared originally in the context of Schiller and Moclair's radio program "Crud" on the Triple M network. Several albums have been released in the name of Guido Hatzis, the first two winning including Do Not Talk Over Me in 1999 (platinum sales, winner of 2001 ARIA for Best Comedy Release) Whatever in 2000 (Platinum sales and winner of 2002 ARIA of Best Comedy Release) and Deported in 2002 (Gold sales) . Most of Hatzis's comedy involves making prank calls that are usually centred on outrageous claims about his looks and abilities. Moclair appropriated the last name "Hatzis" from friend and sometime producer of the "Crud" program, fellow broadcaster and actor Chris Hatzis.

Restoring the Balance

Restoring the Balance was a satirical radio segment that appeared at various times in 2003-2004, 2007 and 2011 on radio station Triple J. The segment attempted to display the contrasting political views between the conservative Australian Howard government, and the majority of the Left wing government-funded Triple J radio station.

3RRR Breakfasters
Tony Moclair (aka Tony Kelly), along with Chris Hatzis and Julian Schiller have hosted the long running breakfast program on 3RRR 102.7 FM, The Breakfasters.

Nova 91.9 Adelaide Breakfast
In August 2004 Schiller and Moclair signed on to do breakfast radio at Nova 91.9, a new Adelaide station.

ABC radio Adelaide
In the mid 2000s Moclair presented weekday breakfast radio on ABC Radio, Adelaide.

DJ Domm
In October 2007, Triple M launched a new podcast only show hosted by Moclair's new character DJ Domm. The show was cancelled by Triple M after Episode 21.

774 ABC Melbourne
Along with Rachel Berger, Moclair hosted breakfast on 774 ABC Melbourne over the 2007/2008 Summer and also appeared on Conversation Hour with Jon Faine.

Triple M
In late 2008, Moclair was a guest co-host of The Shebang radio program filling in for Marty Sheargold. In 2009, Moclair was appointed breakfast co-host alongside Eddie McGuire, Luke Darcy and Mieke Buchan on the Hot Breakfast. Previous to the Hot Breakfast commencing, Moclair worked on the Pete and Myf show following the death of Richard Marsland. Moclair did not appear on air as himself but rather as one of many regular characters such as Tom Cruise, Colin the Taxi Driver and Clem, the show's oldest listener. In addition to this, Moclair wrote sketches for the show. Moclair and Mike Fitzpatrick presented breakfast during August 2009 after the axing of Pete and Myf. Moclair left The Hot Breakfast in June 2010.

3AW
Moclair began appearing on 3AW in 2011, replacing Sam Pang on The Weekend Break with Tom Elliot. The segment is called 'The Sunday Roast', which he presents with John Origlasso.

From the Summer of 2012/2013, The Weekend Break is now hosted by Peter "'Grubby"' Stubbs and Diane "'Dee Dee"' Dunleavy, with Moclair and John Origlasso still appearing on 'The Sunday Roast' segment.

Moclair also has a regular segment on Denis Walter's afternoon 3AW program. He has also filled in as the host of the weekday and weekend Melbourne Overnight programs.

From 9 October 2015 Moclair began hosting a segment called "Friday Night Lights" from 8 - 10pm on Friday evenings on 3AW.

Moclair signed to host 'Australia Overnight', the midnight to dawn radio program, in mid August, 2016.

On 10 January 2020 it was announced via a facebook post that Moclair would not return to Australia Overnight in 2020 and the program would be replaced with a networked show from Sydney hosted by Michael McLaren.

Listeners flooded to the shows Facebook page (http://www.facebook.com/AustraliaOvernight/ to express their disgust in the axing of the show, a petition was also started urging the decision to be reversed by Nine Entertainment the new owners of Radio 3AW.

On 25 April 2020 it was announced that Moclair would be returning to host Australia Overnight from 27 April 2020 less than four months after his axing.

Moclair will be joined by his former producer and panel operator Bianca Johnston, however in February 2022 it was announced that Johnston has moved to afternoons and Sean Woodward would take over as producer.

According to Jocks Journal Nine Radio Head of Content Greg Byrnes said the decision to bring back Moclair and make overnight a local Melbourne program again was a result of listening to the 3AW audience

Writing
Moclair was a writer on Shaun Micallef's Newstopia on SBS and is a writer on Mad As Hell and Spicks and Specks both on the ABC.

Moclair takes a keen interest in modern military history and military aviation and regularly mentions it during his on-air radio stints. He often contributes articles to military magazines and is a monthly feature writer in Australian Aviation Magazine.

Television
He made appearances on the ABC's The Einstein Factor as part of the Brains Trust as well as a contestant on Joker Poker on Channel 10.

Moclair had a role in Season 3 of The Librarians as Bingo, and he made a small guest appearance in Upper Middle Bogan, in Episode 4.

Personal life
Moclair was born in Cork, Ireland, in 1969, the sixth of eight children and the last to be born in Ireland. He has three brothers and four sisters. In December 2006, after the birth of his first child, he and his wife settled in Melbourne.

Moclair graduated from Monash University in 1991 with an arts degree, majoring in history and English literature.

Moclair is a Carlton Football Club supporter and co-hosts their podcasts.

References

External links

Living people
Triple M presenters
Triple J announcers
Australian male comedians
Comedians from Melbourne
Radio personalities from Melbourne
1969 births
Irish emigrants to Australia